Static field may refer to:

Electrostatic field, an electric field that does not change with time
Magnetostatic field, a stationary magnetic field, see Magnetostatics
Class variable, a variable declared with the static keyword in object-oriented programming languages